Jeremiah Peter "Jerry" Harrington (August 12, 1868 – April 16, 1913) was a professional baseball player whose career spanned six seasons, including four seasons in Major League Baseball (MLB). Harrington played the majority of his games in the majors at catcher; however, he did play first base and third base on occasion. In 189 major league games between the Cincinnati Reds and the Louisville Colonels, Harrington batted .227 with 60 runs, 151 hits, 19 doubles, six triples, three home runs, 73 runs batted in (RBIs), and eight stolen bases.

Early life
Harrington was born in Hamden, Ohio on August 12, 1868. His father was the manager of the Keokuk, Iowa baseball club in 1885. At the age of 16, Jerry Harrington began to play semi-professional baseball with the Bonaparte, Iowa team. Two years later, Harrington began to play with the Creston, Iowa ball club of the Iowa League.

Professional career
In 1888, Harrington began his professional career in the Central Interstate League. That season, he played for the Danville Browns, the Davenport club, and the Decatur club. Harrington continued to play in the Central Interstate League in 1889 with the Davenport Hawkeyes/Monmouth Browns. Harrington made his major league debut on April 30, 1890 with the Cincinnati Reds. In his first season, he batted .246 with 25 runs, 58 hits, seven doubles, one triple, one home run, 23 RBIs, and four stolen bases in 65 games. Lee Allen, author of The Cincinnati Reds, wrote that Harrington and fellow player Billy Rhines were two top prospects when they joined the Reds, although nearly unknown today. It was also said that Harrington could throw out a baserunner from his knees. In 1891, Harrington's second season with the Reds, he batted .228 with 25 runs, 76 hits, 10 doubles, five triples, two home runs, 41 RBIs, and four stolen bases in 92 games. In David L. Porter's Biographical Dictionary of American Sports: Q–Z, it was noted that Rhines, Harrington and fellow Reds teammate Pete Browning received fines and suspensions because of misbehavior outside of baseball. Harrington played his final season with the Reds in 1892. In 22 games, Harrington batted .213 with six runs, 13 hits, one double, and three RBIs. In 1893, Harrington joined the Louisville Colonels, which would prove to be his final season in professional baseball. With the Colonels, Harrington batted .111 with four runs, four hits, one double, and three RBIs in 10 games.

Later life
After his professional baseball career was over, Harrington resided in Keokuk, Iowa. There, Harrington became the assistant chief of police. In 1913, Harrington was struck in the head with a beer bottle by Tom Merrit, described in Lee Allen's book The Cincinnati Reds as a "thug." Harrington died on August 16, 1913 at the age of 45 and was buried at Oakland Cemetery in Keokuk, Iowa.

References

External links

1868 births
1913 deaths
People from Keokuk, Iowa
People from Hamden, Ohio
Baseball players from Ohio
Cincinnati Reds players
Louisville Colonels players
Major League Baseball catchers
19th-century baseball players
Danville Browns players
Davenport (minor league baseball) players
Decatur (minor league baseball) players
Davenport Hawkeyes players
Butte (minor league baseball) players
People from Creston, Iowa
People murdered in Iowa
American police officers killed in the line of duty